Parbhani Assembly constituency is one of 288 assembly constituencies of Maharashtra state of India. It comes under Parbhani (Lok Sabha constituency) for Indian general elections.

Current member of legislative assembly (MLA) from this constituency is Rahul Vedprakash Patil of Shiv Sena who defeated Mohammad Gouse Zain of Vanchit Bahujan Aghadi by 81,790 votes.

In 2014 Assembly elections Rahul Patil replaced two time MLA Sanjay Haribhau Jadhav of his own party who went on to become member of parliament from Parbhani (Lok Sabha constituency).

Members of Legislative assembly

Villages in Constituency
List of villages in the constituency

Karadgaon
Mandwa
Mirzapur
Takli Bobade
Takli Kumbhakarna
 Sultanpur
Shahapur
Singla
Mangangaon
Nandkheda
Dharmapuri
Pedgaon
Parva
Gurwa
Bramhangaon
Raipur
Sendra
Ukhalad
Balsa
Pingali
Tatujawla
Tadlimba
Pathra
Varpud
Wangi
Dhar
Kaudgaon
Tadborgaon
Jamb
Karegaon
Asola
Jodparli
Sawangi
Zari
Pimpla
Sadegaon
Wadadimai
Nandgaon
Sukapurwadi
Rahati
Alapur Pandri
Porjawla
Dhangarwadi
Pimpri Deshmukh
Mirkhel
Babli
Sambar
Matkharala
Pimpalgaon Tond
Devthana
Satla
Samsapur
Sanpuri
Durdi
Karadgaon
Dharangaon
Saba
Murumba
Jalalpur
Nandapur
Bramapuri
Pingli Ko

See also
 List of constituencies of the Maharashtra Legislative Assembly
 Parbhani district

References

Assembly constituencies of Maharashtra
Parbhani